Bertram Ashburnham may refer to:
 Bertram Ashburnham, 4th Earl of Ashburnham (1797–1878), British peer
 Bertram Ashburnham, 5th Earl of Ashburnham (1840–1913), British peer